Rosie Al-Yaziji is a Lebanese actress.

Filmography

Plays

Dubbing roles 
 Xiaolin Showdown - Wuya

References 
 General
 
 
 
 
 
 
 =

 Specific

Living people
Lebanese stage actresses
Lebanese voice actresses
Year of birth missing (living people)
21st-century Lebanese actresses